Don Kaeo is a tambon (subdistrict) of Saraphi District, in Chiang Mai Province, Thailand. In 2005, it had a population of 3,913 people. The tambon contains seven villages.

References

Tambon of Chiang Mai province
Populated places in Chiang Mai province